Motovespa or Moto Vespa is the Spanish license holder for the production of Vespa motor scooters. Motovespa has been taken over by Vespa parent manufacturer Piaggio.

These Spanish Vespas often differed in composition from their Italian counterparts. For example, electronic ignition on a Vespa occurred for the first time on the Spanish Vespas, while the Italian Vespas was not fitted with an electronic ignition until later with the Rally model.

Models

 Motovespa 150S
 Motovespa 150 Sprint
 Motovespa GT160
 Motovespa 75PK
 Motovespa 75PK-S
 Motovespa 75PK-S Elestart
 Motovespa 75PK-XL
 Motovespa CL125/CL150/DS200: a cross over model with a Vespa Rally front fork and headlight and a Vespa PX body
 Motovespa Iris: the Spanish variant of the Vespa PX
 Motovespa T5 Sport: the Spanish version of the Vespa T5
 Motovespa TX200
 Motovespa ALX
 Motovespa Vespino
 Motovespa PK125-S

References